Per Svensson (born 19 June 1965) is a Swedish actor.
Born in Karlshamn, Sweden, Svensson studied at NAMA in Stockholm 1991–94. He belongs to the Royal Dramatic Theatre's solid ensemble.

Filmography
The Circle (2015)
Welcome to Sweden (2014)
Kenny Begins (2009) 
Ett gott parti (2007)
Nisse Hults historiska snedsteg (2006)
Olivia Twist (2005)
Håkan Bråkan & Josef (2004)
Håkan Bråkan (2003)
Beck – Pojken i glaskulan (2002)
Suxxess (2002)
Alla älskar Alice (2002)
Deadline (2001)
Två som oss (1999)
Kvinnan i det låsta rummet (1998)
Juloratoriet (1996)
Anna Holt (1996)

References

External links

 Per Svensson at The Royal Dramatic Theatre

Swedish male actors
1965 births
Living people